Jágr is a Czech-language surname. It is related to the German surname Jäger which means "hunter" in German. 

Notable people with the surname include:

 Jaromír Jágr, a Czech ice hockey winger
 Jaroslav Jágr, a Czech ice hockey goaltender
 Martin Jágr, a Czech rugby player
 Miloslav Jágr, a Czech painter

See also

 Yeager (disambiguation)
 Jäger (disambiguation)
 Jagger (disambiguation)
 

Czech-language surnames
Germanic-language surnames
Occupational surnames